Stampede is a 1996 studio album by American country music artist Chris LeDoux. It was his first album released for Capitol Nashville after the Liberty Records name was retired. Overall, it is his 30th album. "Gravitational Pull", "When I Say Forever" and "Five Dollar Fine" were released as singles but didn't make the top 40. "Stampede" would later be released as a single from his 20 Greatest hits Collection in 1999. The album peaked at #33 on the Billboard Top Country Albums chart.

Content
The song "Now That's All Right with Me" was also recorded in 1996 by Mandy Barnett on her self-titled debut album. "Fathers and Sons" was first recorded in 1991 by Charlie Daniels on his album Renegade and then in 1993 on the album Balancing Act by John Jarvis, who co-wrote the song.

Track listing

Personnel
As listed in liner notes
Sam Bacco - percussion, marimba
Mike Brignardello - bass guitar
Gary Bodily - bass guitar
Pat Buchanan - acoustic guitar, electric guitar, slide guitar
Kathy Burdick - background vocals
Larry Byrom - acoustic guitar, electric guitar, slide guitar
Alisa Carroll - background vocals
Larry Franklin - fiddle
Paul Franklin - fiddle, steel guitar
Steve Hinson - steel guitar
Bobby Jensen - keyboards
Bill Johnson  - fiddle, steel guitar
John Jorgenson - electric guitar, 6 string bass
Chris LeDoux - lead vocals, acoustic guitar
Billy Livsey - Hammond Organ, clavinet, Wurlitzer, Vox Organ
Dennis Locorriere - background vocals
Louis Dean Nunley - background vocals
Hargus "Pig" Robbins - piano
Michael Rojas - piano
Mark Sissel - electric guitar
K.W. Turnbow - drums
Steve Turner - drums, percussion

Chart performance

Sources

1996 albums
Chris LeDoux albums
Capitol Records albums